The 1914 College Football All-America team is composed of college football players who were selected as All-Americans for the 1914 college football season. The only selectors for the 1914 season who have been recognized as "official" by the National Collegiate Athletic Association (NCAA) are Walter Camp, whose selections were published in Collier's Weekly, and the International News Service (INS), a newswire founded by William Randolph Hearst.

Although not recognized by the NCAA, many other sports writers, newspapers, and coaches selected All-America teams in 1914.  They include Vanity Fair, Parke H. Davis, Walter Eckersall, The New York Globe, the New York Herald, the New York Evening Mail, the Atlanta Constitution, the Detroit Evening News, The Boston Post, and  The Philadelphia Inquirer.

Overview
Harvard end Huntington Hardwick was the only player who was unanimously selected as a first-team All-American by all 27 selectors identified below.  Other players selected as a first-team All-American by a majority of the selectors were Harvard halfback Eddie Mahan (26 selections), Harvard guard Stan Pennock (26 selections), Princeton tackle Harold Ballin (22 selections), Michigan halfback John Maulbetsch (20 selections), Cornell quarterback Charley Barrett (19 selections), and Dartmouth guard Clarence Spears (16 selections).  The Los Angeles Times reported that "Maulbetsch, Michigan's hero, is about the only one of 1914's stars who received an almost unanimous vote."

The chart below reflects the number of polls in which the leading candidates (any player with at least two first-team All-American designations) were selected as first-team All-Americans.

All-Americans of 1914

Ends

 Huntington "Tack" Hardwick, Harvard (College Football Hall of Fame) (WC–1; VF; PHD; WE–1; FM-1; MO-1; NYH; NYEM-1; NYG; NC; PGT; BN; PEB; AC; PS; WH; DD; PET; SLT; MD; NES; DN; PPL; BP; TT; AW; PI; OUT)
 Louis A. Merrilat, Army (WE–1; VF; PHD; WC-2; FM-3; MO-2; NYH; NYEM-2; NYG; NC; PGT; BN; PEB; AC; NES; TT; OUT)
 John E. O'Hearn, Cornell (WC–1; WE–2; MO-1; NYEM-2; PS; PET; SLT; MD; DN; OUT)
 Maurice R. "Red" Brann, Yale  (WC–2; WH; BP; AW)
 Bob Higgins, Penn State (College Football Hall of Fame) (NYEM-1; PPL)
 Perry Graves, Illinois  (FM–1)
 Reginald Bovill, Washington & Jefferson (FM-3; MO-2; DD)
 Boyd Cherry, Ohio State  (FM–2; OUT)
 Thomas Jefferson Coolidge, Harvard  (FM–2)
 Harvey E. Overesch, Navy (WC–3)
 Edwin Stavrum, Wisconsin (OUT)
 Robbie Robinson, Auburn (OUT)

Tackles

 Harold Ballin, Princeton (College Football Hall of Fame) (WC–1; VF; PHD; WE–1; FM-1; MO-1; NYH; NYEM-1; NYG; NC; BN; AC; PS; WH; SLT; MD; NES; DN; BP; TT; AW; PI; OUT)
 Bud Talbott, Yale (WE–1; VF; MO-1; NYH; NYEM-2; BN; AC; WH; DD; PET; OUT)
 Britain Patterson, Washington & Jefferson  (WC–2; FM-3; PEB; PS; PET; PPL; BP; TT)
 Walter Trumbull, Harvard  (WC–1; PHD; DD; DN; AW; PI; OUT)
 Vic Halligan, Nebraska (WC–3; WE–2; FM-1; PGT; MD; OUT)
 Cub Buck, Wisconsin (WE–2; PGT; SLT; OUT)
 John Toohey, Rutgers (NYEM-1; NYG; NC; NES)
 Pete Maxfield, Lafayette (MO-2; PEB)
 Ted Shultz, Washington & Lee (PPL)
 Alex Weyand, Army  (College Football Hall of Fame) (WC–3; FM-2)
 Bob Nash, Rutgers (College Football Hall of Fame) (WC–2)
 Ray Keeler Wisconsin  (FM–2; OUT)
 Edward J. Gallogly, Cornell (NYEM-2)
 George D. Howell, Trinity College (MO-2)
 Lennox F. Armstrong, Illinois (FM-3)
 Will Burton, Kansas (OUT)
 Laurens Shull, Chicago (OUT)
 Josh Cody, Vanderbilt (College Football Hall of Fame) (OUT)
 Farmer Kelly, Tennessee (OUT)
 Bob Taylor Dobbins, Sewanee (OUT)

Guards

 Stan Pennock, Harvard (College Football Hall of Fame) (WC–1; VF; PHD; WE–1; FM-2; MO-1; NYH; NYEM-1; NYG; NC; PGT; BN; PEB; AC; PS; WH; DD; PET; SLT; MD; NES; DN; PPL; BP; TT; AW; PI; OUT)
 Clarence Spears, Dartmouth (WC–3; WE–1; FM-1; NYH; NYEM-1; NYG; NC; PGT; BN; PEB; PS; DD; NES; PPL; BP; AW; PI)
 Ralph Chapman, Illinois (WC–1; PHD; WE–2; FM-2; AC; SLT; MD; OUT)
 Eddie Trenkmann, Princeton (MO-2; PET; TT)
 Wilbur Shenk, Princeton (WC-2; VF; NYEM-2; OUT)
 Arlie Mucks, Wisconsin (FM–1)
 Michalis Dorizas, Penn(FM–1)
 Harry Routh, Purdue (FM-3; DN)
 Louis Jordan, Texas (WC-2)
 Joseph J. "Red" O'Hare, Army (WE-2)
 Harold White, Syracuse (NYEM-2; OUT)
 Earl W. Mills, Navy (MO-2)
 Laurence B. Meacham, Army (WC–3)
 Dale Munsick, Cornell (FM-3)

Centers

 John McEwan, Army (WC–1; WE-1; MO-2; NYG-1; PS; SLT; DN; BP; AW)
 Paul Des Jardien, Chicago (College Football Hall of Fame) (WC–2; VF; FM-2; MO-1; PGT; BN; AC; DD; MD; TT; OUT)
 Burleigh Cruikshank, Washington & Jefferson (WC-3; FM-3; NYH; NYEM-2; NC; PEB; WH; PET; PPL)
 Albert Journeay, Penn (PHD; WE-2; NYEM-1; WH [g]; NES; PI; OUT)
 Bob Peck, Pittsburgh (College Football Hall of Fame) (FM–1)
 Boles Rosenthal, Minnesota (OUT)
 Willard Cool, Cornell (OUT)
 James Raynsford, Michigan (OUT)
 Boozer Pitts, Auburn (OUT)

Quarterbacks
 Charley Barrett, Cornell (College Football Hall of Fame) (WC–2; VF; WE–1; FM-1; NYH; NYEM-1; NYG [hb]; BN; PEB; AC; PS; WH; DD; PET; MD; NES; DN; PPL; TT; AW; OUT)
 Milt Ghee, Dartmouth (WC–1; WE–2; FM-2; MO-1; NYEM-2; BP; PI)
 Vernon Prichard, Army (NYG; NC; PGT; SLT; OUT)
 Alexander D. Wilson, Yale (WC-3; OUT)
 Potsy Clark, Illinois (FM-3; OUT)
 Huntley, New York (MO-2)
 David Paddock, Georgia (PHD; OUT)
 Malcolm Justin Logan, Harvard (OUT)
 Frank Glick, Princeton (OUT)
 William H. Tow, Amherst (OUT)
 Irby Curry, Vanderbilt (OUT)
 Robert Kent Gooch, Virginia (OUT)
 Paul Russell, Chicago (OUT)
 Tommy Hughitt, Michigan (OUT)
 Sammy Gross, Iowa (OUT)
 Wilbur Hightower, Northwestern (OUT)
 Louis E. Pickerel, Ohio State (OUT)

Halfbacks
 John Maulbetsch, Michigan (College Football Hall of Fame) (WC–1; VF [fb]; PHD; WE–1; FM-1; MO-1; PGT [fb]; BN; AC; PS; DD; PET; SLT; MD; NES; DN; PPL; BP; AW; PI; OUT)
 Eddie Mahan, Harvard (College Football Hall of Fame) (WC-1 [fb]; VF; PHD; WE–1; FM-2; MO-1; NYH; NYEM-1; NYG; NC; PGT; BN; PEB; AC [fb]; PS; WH [fb]; DD; PET; SLT; MD [fb]; NES; DN [fb]; PPL; BP [fb]; TT; AW [fb]; PI; OUT)
 Johnny Spiegel, Washington & Jefferson (WC–2; VF; PHD; FM-1; NYH; NYEM-1; AC; DN; AW)
 Frederick Bradlee, Harvard (WC–1; WE-2; NYEM-2; WH; BP; TT; OUT)
 Harold Pogue, Illinois (WC–3; WE-2; FM-3; PGT; MD; OUT)
 William "Billy" Cahall, Lehigh  (WC-2; MO-2)
 Howard Parker Talman, Rutgers (WC–3)
 William H. Miller, Pittsburgh (FM-3)
 Andrew Toolan, Williams (MO-2; OUT)
 Dick Rutherford, Nebraska (OUT)
 Guy Chamberlain, Nebraska (OUT)
 Tam Rose, Syracuse (OUT)
 Marcus Wilkinson, Syracuse (OUT)
 Carroll Knowles, Yale (OUT)
 Moore, Princeton (OUT)
 Eugene Mayer, Virginia (OUT)
 Gray, Chicago (OUT)
 Bart Macomber, Illinois (OUT)
 Ammie Sikes, Vanderbilt (OUT)
 Lee Tolley, Sewanee (OUT)
 Dave Tayloe, North Carolina (OUT)

Fullbacks

 Harry LeGore, Yale (WC–2; WE–2; FM-1; MO-1; NYH; NYEM-1; PS; WH [hb]; PET; TT; PI; OUT)
Lawrence Whitney, Dartmouth (WC–3; WE–1; FM-2 [hb]; NYEM-2 [hb]; NYG; NC [hb]; PEB [hb]; SLT; NES; PPL; OUT)
Lorin Solon, Minnesota (WC–3 [end]; WE–2 [end]; FM–2; BN; DD; OUT)
Ray Eichenlaub, Notre Dame (College Football Hall of Fame) (MO-2; NC)
Haps Benfer, Albright (PEB; OUT)
Hugo Franck, Harvard (NYEM-2)
Charles Shuler, Jr., Cornell (FM-3)
 Pete Calac, Carlisle (OUT)
 Dan Kenan, Wesleyan (OUT)
 Carl Philippi, Cornell (OUT)
 Campbell "Honus" Graf, Ohio State (OUT)
 Charles Brickley, Harvard (OUT)

Key
NCAA recognized selectors for 1914
 WC = Collier's Weekly as selected by Walter Camp
 FM = Frank G. Menke, Sporting Editor of the I.N.S.

Other selectors
 VF = Vanity Fair, selected based on selections of 175 "prominent newspapermen of the country"
 PHD = Parke H. Davis, member of rules committee and noted football historian
 WE = Walter Eckersall, of the Chicago Tribune
 MO = Monty, New York sports writer
 NYH = New York Herald
 NYEM = James P. Sinnot, of the New York Evening Mail, "who is recognized as one of the best sporting writers in the East"
 NYG = New York Globe, selected by Mack Whalen
 NC = Newark Sunday Call, selected by William S. Hunt
 PGT = Pittsburgh Gazette-Times, selected by Fred M. Walker
 BN = Baltimore News
 PEB = Philadelphia Evening Bulletin
 AC = Atlanta Constitution, selected by sporting editor Dick Jemison
 PS = Pittsburgh Sun, selected by sporting editor James J. Long
 WH = Washington Herald, selected by William Peet
 DD = Davis J. Davies in the Pittsburgh Dispatch
 PET = Philadelphia Evening Telegraph, selected by sporting editor Louis M. Toughill
 SLT = St. Louis Times, selected by George Henger
 MD = Michigan Daily, selected by sporting editor F.M. Church
 NES = Newark Evening Star, selected by sporting editor Joseph P. Norton
 DN = Detroit Evening News, selected by sporting editor H.G. Salsinger
 PPL = Philadelphia Public Ledger, selected by Robert W. Maxwell
 BP = Boston Post, by Charles H. Parker
 TT = Tom Thorp in the 'New York Evening Journal AW = Alexander Wilson, Yale University
 PI = Philadelphia Inquirer, selected by sporting editor M. Neagle Rawlins
 OUT = Outing'' magazine's "FOOTBALL ROLL OF HONOR: The Men Whom the Best Coaches of the Country Have Named as the Stars of the Gridiron in 1914"

Bold = Consensus All-American
 1 – First-team selection
 2 – Second-team selection
 3 – Third-team selection

See also
 1914 College Football All-Southern Team
 1914 All-Western college football team
 1914 All-Western Conference football team

References

All-America Team
College Football All-America Teams